Leu Mazurkevich (September 1939 – 4 February 2019) was a Belarusian footballer and football coach. He is the first coach in the history of Belarusian football club BATE Barysaw.

External links 
 Лев Мазуркевич: «Наш взлёт был стремительным» — «Всё о футболе», №7 (561), с. 14 

1939 births
2019 deaths
Belarusian football managers
FC BATE Borisov managers